Saskatchewan History is a magazine dedicated to exploring the history of the province of Saskatchewan.  Published since 1948 by the Saskatchewan Archives Board, the magazine publishes both scholarly and light-reading articles.  Topics of the magazine have included: ethnicity and race, Métis and First Nations history, immigration, businesses and organizations, history of the fur trade, women's history and events that have shaped Saskatchewan's past.  Contributors to the magazine have included many prominent prairie and social historians.

Currently the magazine publishes twice a year, in spring and fall. Publication ended in 2017.

References

External links
Saskatchewan History

Biannual magazines published in Canada
History magazines published in Canada
Magazines established in 1948
Magazines published in Saskatchewan